The National Federation of State High School Associations (NFHS) is the body that writes the rules of competition for most high school sports and activities in the United States. NFHS's headquarters are located in White River State Park in Indianapolis, Indiana.

Member and affiliate associations

Over 19,500 high schools belong to associations that are members of the NFHS. Most high schools, whether public or private, belong to their state's high school association; in turn, each state association belongs to the NFHS. However, in states that have separate associations for public and non-public high schools, only the public-school bodies are full NFHS members.

For example, the Texas University Interscholastic League (public schools, with non-public schools generally not allowed) is a full member; the largest association governing non-public schools, the Texas Association of Private and Parochial Schools, is an affiliate member, while other governing bodies are not NFHS members at any level. Similarly, the Virginia High School League, open only to public schools, is a full member, the state's largest association for non-public schools is an affiliate member, and other governing bodies are not members at all.

The case in Mississippi is slightly different; the body governing public schools is a full member, while the body governing private schools is not an NFHS member at any level. In the state of Alabama, the public schools and a handful of private schools compete in the AHSAA (Alabama High School Athletic Association) which is a full member of the NFHS. The majority of private schools in the state are members of the AISA (Alabama Independent School Association) a non-member that uses NFHS rules. The AHSAA will not allow its members to play AISA schools but the AISA schools do compete with public and private schools outside of Alabama.

Iowa has separate governing associations for boys' and girls' sports, including the Iowa High School Athletic Association and the Iowa Girls High School Athletic Union. Only the Iowa High School Athletic Association is a full member of the NFHS; the girls' governing body is an affiliate member.

The provincial associations of Canada are affiliate members of the NFHS.

The NFHS publishes rules books for each sport or activity, and most states adopt those rules wholly for state high school competition including the non member private school associations.

The NFHS offered an online Coach Education Program in January 2007. It released a course, Fundamentals of Coaching. The NFHS has announced that it will offer a National Coach Certification in September 2009.  This will enable to coaches to become a Level 1 - Accredited Interscholastic Coach issued by the NFHS.

Member associations

 Alabama High School Athletic Association
 Alaska School Activities Association
 Arizona Interscholastic Association
 Arkansas Activities Association
 California Interscholastic Federation
 Colorado High School Activities Association
 Connecticut Interscholastic Athletic Conference
 Delaware Interscholastic Athletic Association
 District of Columbia Interscholastic Athletic Association
 District of Columbia State Athletic Association
 Florida High School Athletic Association
 Georgia High School Association
 Hawaii High School Athletic Association
 Idaho High School Activities Association
 Illinois High School Association
 Indiana High School Athletic Association
 Iowa High School Athletic Association
 Kansas State High School Activities Association
 Kentucky High School Athletic Association
 Louisiana High School Athletic Association
 Maine Principals' Association
 Maryland Public Secondary Schools Athletic Association
 Massachusetts Interscholastic Athletic Association
 Michigan High School Athletic Association
 Minnesota State High School League
 Mississippi High School Activities Association
 Missouri State High School Activities Association
 Montana High School Association
 Nebraska School Activities Association
 Nevada Interscholastic Activities Association
 New Hampshire Interscholastic Athletic Association
 New Jersey State Interscholastic Athletic Association
 New Mexico Activities Association
 New York State Public High School Athletic Association
 North Carolina High School Athletic Association
 North Dakota High School Activities Association
 Ohio High School Athletic Association
 Oklahoma Secondary School Activities Association
 Oregon School Activities Association
 Pennsylvania Interscholastic Athletic Association
 Rhode Island Interscholastic League
 South Carolina High School League
 South Dakota High School Activities Association
 Tennessee Secondary School Athletic Association
 University Interscholastic League (Texas)
 Utah High School Activities Association
 Vermont Principals' Association
 Virginia High School League
 Washington Interscholastic Activities Association
 West Virginia Secondary School Activities Commission
 Wisconsin Interscholastic Athletic Association
 Wyoming High School Activities Association

Affiliate associations

 Alberta Schools Athletic Association
 British Columbia School Sports
 Department of Defense Education Activity
 Florida School Music Association
 Georgia Independent School Association
 Illinois Elementary School Association
 Independent Interscholastic Athletic Association of Guam
 Iowa Girls High School Athletic Union
 Iowa High School Music Association
 Manitoba High Schools Athletic Association, Inc
 Michigan Interscholastic Forensic Association
 New Brunswick Interscholastic Athletic Association
 Nova Scotia School Athletic Federation
 Oregon Interscholastic Ski Racing Association
 Pennsylvania Independent Schools Athletic Association
 Réseau du sport étudiant du Québec
 Saint Thomas Saint John Interscholastic Association
 Saskatchewan High Schools Athletic Association
 School Sports Newfoundland and Labrador
 South Carolina Independent School Association
 St. Croix Interscholastic Athletic Association
 Texas Association of Private and Parochial Schools
 Virginia Independent Schools Athletic Association
 Wisconsin High School Forensic Association
 Wisconsin School Music Association

Players by sport

Executive Directors

 L. W. Smith, 1920–27 (secretary of the board)
 C. W. Whitten, 1927–40 (manager, later executive secretary)
 H. V. Porter, 1940–58 (executive secretary)
 Cliff Fagan, 1958–77 (executive secretary)
 Brice B. Durbin, 1977–1993
 Robert F. Kanaby, 1993–2010
 Robert B. Gardner, 2010–2018
 Karissa Niehoff, 2018–present

National High School Hall of Fame

The National High School Hall of Fame is a program of the National Federation of State High School Associations that honors individuals who have made outstanding contributions to high school sports or performing arts. Since 1986, the Hall of Fame enshrinement ceremony has been the final event of the National Federation's annual summer meeting, which is held in late June and early July and attended by board members and executives of the state high school associations.

See also
 Gatorade Player of the Year awards (in various sports)
 Wendy's High School Heisman (student-athletes in various sports)

References, including organizations' official websites

Further reading

External links
 
 NFHS Learn
 NFHS Record Book covering various sports, including baseball, basketball, softball, football, and both field and ice hockey

Associations of schools
Sports in Indianapolis
Sports organizations established in 1920
1920 establishments in the United States
Sports governing bodies in the United States
Non-profit organizations based in Indianapolis